Caddo High School is a public high school (grades 9–12) in Caddo, Oklahoma.

As of 2015, it has  132 students and 12 teachers. The football team won the OSSAA Class B Championship in 2011.

Athletics 
Caddo offers the following sports to its students:

Baseball
Basketball (Boys, Girls)
Cheerleading
Cross Country (Boys, Girls)
Football
Power Lifting
Softball
Track (Boys, Girls)

References 

Public high schools in Oklahoma
Schools in Bryan County, Oklahoma